The Toyota Challenge is a rugby union competition hosted in South Africa by the Cheetahs, a team sponsored by Toyota SA. The first tournament took place at the Toyota Stadium in Bloemfontein between the 13 November and 26 November 2021.

In 2021, four teams played against the Cheetahs across four matches, with a 250,000 rand prize money for each match. In addition, players were rewarded for "positive play actions" during the games, while fans were rewarded for supporting their favourite teams in the stadium and online on various social media platforms.

The Cheetahs are currently without a permanent tournament, whilst the Stormers and Sharks compete in the United Rugby Championship. CSM Știința Baia Mare competes in Romania's top level professional league the SuperLiga and Diables Barcelona are a newly formed Spanish pro team to promote professionalism in the Spain.

The Toyota Challenge fixtures are broadcast by SuperSport.

The Cheetahs won six out of eight Toyota Challenge matches since 2021 making them the most successful team in the tournament.

In 2022, the competition returned with five team competing in a four-match Toyota Challenge with each match winning again winning a 250,000 rand prize money. The Cheetahs remained as the hosts and are joined by Emerging Ireland, USA Falcons XV and Griquas. Italy A had been set to participate, but later withdrew and replaced by the Bulls.

Competing teams
  Cheetahs (2021, 2022)
  CSM Știința Baia Mare (2021)
  Diables Barcelona (2021)
  Sharks (2021)
  Stormers XV (2021)
  Western Province XV (2022)
  Bulls (2022)
  Griquas (2022)
  Pumas (2022)
  Emerging Ireland (2022)
  USA National A (2022)

Overall Record
The overall record for the teams in the Toyota Challenge matches is as follows:

2021

Toyota Challenge Fixtures
The below fixtures counted towards games where the winners would win the 250,000 rand prize money.

Toyota Friendlies

2022

Toyota Challenge Fixtures
The below fixtures counted towards games where the winners would win the 250,000 rand prize money.

Toyota Friendlies

See also
 2021 end-of-year rugby union internationals
 2022 end-of-year rugby union internationals

References

Toyota Challenge
2021 in South African rugby union
August 2021 sports events in Africa
2021 in Spanish sport
2021 in Romanian sport